Sirogonium is a genus of filamentous charophyte green algae of the order Zygnematales. It is found in freshwater areas on all continents but Antarctica. Spirogyra measures approximately 32–115 μm in width. Each cell contains 2–10 chloroplasts in a ribbon, in contrast to the closely related genus Spirogyra, which has chloroplasts in a coil.

Species
The following species are currently accepted:

 Sirogonium calosporum Zhu
 Sirogonium ceylanicum Wittrock
 Sirogonium decoratum Prescott
 Sirogonium denticulatum W.J.Zhu
 Sirogonium floridanum (Transeau) G.M.Smith
 Sirogonium fuscosporum Woodhead & Tweed
 Sirogonium guangzhouense Zhu
 Sirogonium hui (L.C.Li) Transeau
 Sirogonium illinoisense (Transeau) G.M.Smith
 Sirogonium indicum Singh
 Sirogonium inflatum Dixit
 Sirogonium kamatii Kadlubowska
 Sirogonium khoriense Masud-ul-Hassan & M.Nizamuddin

 Sirogonium melanosporum (Randhawa) Transeau
 Sirogonium phacosporum Skuja

 Sirogonium pseudofloridanum (Prescott) Transeau
 Sirogonium reticulatum Randhawa
 Sirogonium retroversum H.C.Wood
 Sirogonium sticticum (Smith) Kützing

 Sirogonium vandalurense Iyengar
 Sirogonium ventersicum Transeau

References

 John Whitton, B.A. and Brook, A.J. (editors) 2002. The Freshwater Algal Flora of the British Isles. Cambridge University Press, Cambridge. .

Zygnemataceae